Artie P. Hatzes (born May 24, 1957) is an American astronomer. He is a professor at the Friedrich Schiller University of Jena and director of the Karl Schwarzschild Observatory (Thuringian State Observatory).

Hatzes is a pioneer in the search of extrasolar planets and is working on the COROT space mission. His achievements have included discovering the extrasolar planets Pollux b, Epsilon Eridani b and HD 13189 companion.

External links 
 Bild von Hatzes

1957 births
Living people
American astronomers
People from Fort Worth, Texas
California Institute of Technology alumni
Discoverers of exoplanets
People from Havre de Grace, Maryland